is a Japanese action suspense drama starring Kento Nakajima and Sho Hirano. It was first scheduled to broadcast on April 11, 2020 on Nippon TV, but was postponed until June 27 of the same year due to the COVID-19 outbreak delaying the filming. The drama is a remake of a 2017 South Korean film, Midnight Runners.

Plot
The story revolves on two best friends who are cadets at a police academy, the "nerd" Kai Honma (Nakajima) and the "jock" Jiro Ichinose (Hirano). They solve cases that appears while making use of the knowledge that they acquire while studying at the academy.

Cast
He is the type who carefully thinks before taking an action. His name is a play on words on a kansai accent expression, "honma kai?!" (seriously?!).
He had an older brother who wanted to be a police officer, and decided to take his place instead.
 Yuri Nakamura as 
 Taizo Harada as 
 Yūsuke Iseya as

Guest cast 
Youko Maki as Megu (ep 01)
Mone Kamishiraishi as Ami (ep 02, 03)
Masaya Katō as Shibamoto (ep 02, 03)
Shugo Oshinari as Yubisuke Yubitomo (ep 04)
Misako Renbutsu as Rinka Mochizuki (ep 05)
Dori Sakurada as Shiraki (ep 05)
Tsutomu Takahashi as Detective Maruhashi (ep 05)
Jouji Shibue as Detective Konpon (ep 05)
Kyoko Hasegawa as Naoko Tenma (ep 06–07)
Hayato Kakizawa as Tomoya Tenma (ep 06–07)
Houka Kinoshita as Police Commander Kunieda (ep 06–07, 09–10)
Satoru Matsuo as Seiji Nonomura (ep 08)
Ginpunchō as Reiko Nonomura (ep 08)
Hannya as Kato (ep 08)
Kazuma Yamane as Detective Sunaoka (ep 09–10)
Mayuko Nishiyama as Harumi (ep 10)
Mao as Kamio Mai (ep 10)

Episodes

References

External links
 
 English official website at Nippon TV

2020 Japanese television series debuts
Japanese drama television series
2020s Japanese television series
Nippon TV dramas
Japanese remakes of South Korean films